John Taylor, Johnny Taylor or similar may refer to:

Academics
John Taylor (Oxford), Vice-Chancellor of Oxford University, 1486–1487
John Taylor (classical scholar) (1704–1766), English classical scholar
John Taylor (English publisher) (1781–1864), British publisher and Egypt scholar
John B. Taylor (born 1946), American economist, known as the creator of the Taylor rule
John Taylor, architect of the UK e-Science programme
John Taylor, president of University of Pittsburgh

Science
John Taylor (mathematician) (born 1664), English mathematician and traveler
John Taylor (pathologist) (1932–2010), Canadian and English pathologist and medical researcher 
John R. Taylor, American physics professor, author of An Introduction to Error Analysis
John Bryan Taylor (born 1928), British physicist known for the Taylor state and work in plasma physics
John G. Taylor (1931–2012), British physicist, neural-network researcher and author
John Clayton Taylor (born 1930), British mathematical physicist
John Taylor (oculist) (1703–1772), surgeon and medical charlatan
John W. Taylor (professor) (born 1950), American mycologist researching fungal evolution

The arts

TV and film
John Taylor (actor), known for The Ringer
John Taylor (documentary filmmaker) (1914–1992), British documentary filmmaker
John Taylor (presenter), Australian television presenter
John Taylor (voice actor), voice of Sal the space octopus in Astroblast!
Johnny Taylor, a fictional character in the TV series Tracy Beaker Returns

Art
John Taylor (painter) (c. 1585–1651), artist and friend of Shakespeare
John Taylor (1739–1838), English portrait artist
John Bigelow Taylor (born 1950), New York photographer

Authors
John Taylor (poet) (1578–1653), English pamphleteer, poet and waterman
John Taylor (journalist) (1757–1832), English oculist, drama critic, editor and newspaper publisher
John Edward Taylor (1791–1844), British journalist, or his son, owners of the Manchester Guardian
John Ellor Taylor (1837–1895), popular science writer
John Russell Taylor (born 1935), English critic and author
John Martin Taylor, American food writer, known as Hoppin' John
John W. R. Taylor, British aviation expert and editor

Music
John C. J. Taylor (born 1951), Australian musician (bass), composer, former member of Little Heroes
John Lloyd Taylor (born 1982), guitarist with Jonas Brothers
John Taylor (bass guitarist) (born 1960), British bassist for Duran Duran 
John Taylor (composer), wrote music for Charlie Girl
John Taylor (Geordie songwriter) (1840–1891), songwriter and poet
John Taylor (guitarist), lead guitarist for British alternative rock band Young Guns
John Taylor (jazz) (1942–2015), English pianist
John Taylor (Scottish fiddler), Scottish fiddler from Buckie, appeared in So I Married an Axe Murderer
John Taylor (Unitarian hymn writer) (1750–1826), poet and composer from Norwich, England
John T. Taylor (saxophonist), saxophonist and co-writer of "The Boy from New York City"
Johnnie Taylor (1934–2000), American singer
Jonny Taylor, contestant on Australian Idol
Little Johnny Taylor (1943–2002), American singer
John Taylor (born 1963), Jamaican dancehall musician better known as Chaka Demus.
John R. Taylor, recording engineer and producer, co-founder of Grosvenor Road Studios

Comedians
 Johnny Taylor, Jr., stand-up comedian

Business and tradesmen
John Taylor (bookseller) (fl. 1710s), English bookseller and publisher in St. Paul's Churchyard, London
John Taylor (manufacturer) (1704–1775), English manufacturer and banker of Birmingham
John Taylor of Ashbourne (1711-1788), English lawyer and cleric
John Taylor (mining engineer) (1779–1863), English mining engineer and engineer of the Tavistock Canal
John Taylor (paper manufacturer) (1809–1871), Canadian pioneer in the pulp and paper industry
John Taylor (settler) (1821–1890),settler to York, Western Australia
John Taylor (architect) (1833–1912), British architect
John Taylor (Taylor Ham) (1837–1909), American food inventor and entrepreneur
John Taylor (trader) (died 1898), Creole trader killed during Sierra Leone's Hut Tax War
John Taylor (Velocette) (fl. 1900s), founder of Veloce Ltd. motorcycle firm
John Taylor (inventor) (born 1936), horologist and inventor of controls for electric kettles
Johnny C. Taylor Jr., American lawyer, author and public speaker
John Donnithorne Taylor, English landowner
John R. Taylor III (born 1957), American computer game designer
John William Taylor, English philanthropist and bellfounder
Sir John Taylor, 1st Baronet (1745–1786), dilettante

Government figures

Australia
John Howard Taylor (1861–1925), Western Australian politician
John Taylor (Australian politician) (1908–1961), Member of the Queensland Legislative Assembly
John Taylor (public servant) (1930–2011), senior Australian public servant

Canada
John Richard Parish Taylor (1892–1950), politician in Saskatchewan
John Robeson Taylor (1889–1976), politician in Saskatchewan
John Russell Taylor (politician) (1917–2002), Canadian MP representing Vancouver-Burrard
John Taylor (Manitoba politician) (1834–1925), MLA in Manitoba
John Taylor (Nova Scotia politician) (1816–1881), Liberal MHA for Halifax County

New Zealand
John Parkin Taylor (1812–1875), MP for Dunedin Country, Superintendent of Southland Province

Nigeria
 John Taylor (Nigerian judge) (1917–1973)

United Kingdom
John Taylor (fl. 1385–1401), MP for Reigate
John Taylor (by 1493–1547 or later), MP for Hastings
John Taylor (by 1533–1568), MP for Lichfield
John Taylor (1655–1729), MP for Sandwich
John Taylor, Baron Ingrow (1917–2002),  life peer, brewer and politician, former Lord Lieutenant of West Yorkshire
John Taylor, Baron Kilclooney (born 1937), Northern Ireland politician
John Taylor, Baron Taylor of Holbeach (born 1943), Conservative life peer and director of Taylor's Bulbs of Spalding
John Taylor, Baron Taylor of Warwick (born 1952), Conservative 
John Taylor (Dumbarton Burghs MP) (1857–1936), Liberal MP for Dumbarton Burghs, 1918–1922
John Taylor (West Lothian MP) (1902–1962), Labour MP 1951–1962
John Taylor (Solihull MP) (1941–2017)
John Taylor (trade unionist) (1861/2–1942), councillor in Dudley
John George Taylor (fl. 1850s), official of the Foreign Office, archaeologist
John Wilkinson Taylor (politician) (1855–1934), Labour MP for Chester-le-Street, 1906–1919
John Debenham Taylor, British intelligence officer
John Thomas Taylor (British Museum) (1840–1908), English museum official and local politician

United States
John Taylor (South Carolina governor) (1770–1832), American politician from South Carolina
John Taylor (14th Congress), American politician from South Carolina
John Taylor of Caroline (1753–1824), American politician & scholar from Virginia
John Taylor (Mississippi judge) (c. 1785–1820), justice of the first Mississippi Supreme Court
John Taylor (19th-century Iowa politician) (1808–1886), member of the Iowa Territorial Legislature and Iowa House of Representatives
John Taylor (20th-century Iowa politician) (born 1870), member of the Iowa House of Representatives and Iowa Senate
John C. Taylor (1890–1983), U.S. Representative from South Carolina
John J. Taylor (New York politician) (1808–1892), American politician
John J. Taylor (Pennsylvania politician) (born 1955), American politician
John L. Taylor (1805–1870), U.S. Representative from Ohio, 1847–55
John Louis Taylor (1769–1829), chief justice of the North Carolina Supreme Court
John M. Taylor (Alabama judge), on List of justices of the Alabama Supreme Court
John May Taylor (1838–1911), U.S. Representative from Tennessee, 1883–87
John P. Taylor (died 1948), American District Attorney in New York, 1914–1920
John Stansel Taylor (1871–1936), American citrus grower and politician from Florida
John W. Taylor (politician) (1784–1854), New York politician and Speaker of the U.S. House of Representatives from 1820-1821 and 1825-1827
John Wilkinson Taylor (educator) (1906–2001), American educator & international administrator
John Edwards Taylor (1834–1914), mayor of Morristown, New Jersey
John Peroutt Taylor (1855-1930), American politician from Mississippi

Military
John Taylor (Medal of Honor), American Civil War sailor and Medal of Honor recipient
John Taylor (Royal Navy) (1775–1848), Scottish sailor who served with Nelson then emigrated to Canada
John Taylor (VC) (1822–1857), English sailor
John Taylor (Imperial Brazilian Navy) (also known as João Taylor, 1796-1855) Officer from the Royal Navy who served in the Imperial Brazilian Navy
John R. M. Taylor, U.S. infantry captain who compiled what became known as the Philippine Insurgent Records
John Taylor (archivist) (1921–2008), American military archivist at the National Archives
John Thomas Taylor (1886–1965), American soldier, lawyer, and chief lobbyist for the American Legion from 1919 to 1950
John Lowther du Plat Taylor, British founder of the Army Post Office Corps and the Post Office Rifles

Notorious figures
John Taylor (pirate) (fl. 1718–1723), pirate active in the East Indies and Indian Ocean
John Albert Taylor (1959–1996), American rapist and murderer, executed by firing squad
John B. Taylor, American multiple murderer, convicted for the Wendy's massacre
John Ross Taylor (1913–1994), Canadian neo-Nazi leader
John Taylor (criminal) (born 1956), British convicted murderer and rapist
John Taylor, male alias of British woman Mary Anne Talbot (1778–1808), who was a sailor and soldier

Religious figures
John Taylor (Master of the Rolls) (c. 1480–1534), British religious leader & jurist
John Taylor (bishop of Lincoln) (c. 1503–1554), British religious leader, Bishop of Lincoln
John Taylor (dissenting preacher) (1694–1761), English Presbyterian theologian
John Taylor (archdeacon of Leicester) (1711–1772), English priest
John Taylor (Unitarian hymn writer) (1750–1826), businessman and hymn composer (grandson of above)
John Taylor (Baptist preacher) (1752–1833), Baptist preacher in Kentucky
John Taylor (missionary in South Africa) (1767–?), first British missionary to settle in South Africa
John Taylor (doctor) (died 1821), missionary in India
John Taylor (Mormon) (1808–1887), third president of The Church of Jesus Christ of Latter-day Saints, 1880–1887
John W. Taylor (Mormon) (1858–1916), member of the Quorum of the Twelve Apostles in The Church of Jesus Christ of Latter-day Saints
John H. Taylor (Mormon) (1875–1946), leader in The Church of Jesus Christ of Latter-day Saints
John Taylor (bishop of Sodor and Man) (1883–1961), Church of England bishop, and father of the below Bishop of Winchester
John Taylor (bishop of Sheffield) (1912–1971), Bishop of Sheffield in the Church of England
John Taylor (bishop of Winchester) (1914–2001), Anglican missionary scholar, and son of the above Bishop of Sodor and Man
John Edward Taylor (bishop) (1914–1976), Roman Catholic bishop of Stockholm, 1962–76
John Taylor (bishop of St Albans) (1929–2016), British priest, Bishop of St Albans, 1980–1995
John Taylor (bishop of Glasgow and Galloway) (1932-2021), British priest, Scottish Episcopal Church, Bishop of Glasgow and Galloway, 1991–1998
John H. Taylor (bishop) (born 1954), Episcopal bishop and chief of staff to former U.S. President Richard Nixon

Sports figures

Australia
John Taylor (Australian footballer) (born 1963), Australian football player
Johnny Taylor (sportsman) (1895–1971), dual international cricketer and rugby union footballer for Australia
John Taylor (rugby union, born 1949) (born 1949), rugby union footballer for Australia
John Taylor (cricketer, born 1979), former Western Australia cricketer

United States
Jack Taylor (1890s pitcher) (1873–1900), aka "Brewery Jack", baseball player
Jack Taylor (1900s pitcher) (1874–1938), baseball player
John Taylor (athlete) (1882–1908), runner; first African American Olympic gold medalist
John Taylor (American football) (born 1962), football player
John Taylor (baseball) (birth/death dates unknown), Negro leagues baseball player
John Taylor (volleyball) (born 1944), American former volleyball player
John Taylor (basketball) (born 1989), American professional basketball player
John Coard Taylor (1901–1946), American sprinter
John I. Taylor (1875–1938), owner of the Boston Red Sox, 1904–11
Johnathan Taylor (born 1979), American football player
Johnny Taylor (basketball) (born 1974), basketball player
Schoolboy Johnny Taylor (1916–1987), American Negro leagues baseball player
Steel Arm Johnny Taylor (1879–1956), American Negro leagues baseball player

United Kingdom
Jack Taylor (footballer, born 1872) (1872–1949), Scottish footballer (John Daniel Taylor)
Jack Taylor (referee) (1930–2012), real name John, English football referee
Jock Taylor (John Robert Taylor, 1954–1982), British motorcycle sidecar racer
John Henry Taylor (1871–1963), British golfer 
John Paskin Taylor (1928–2015), British Olympic field hockey player
John Taylor (cricketer, born 1819) (1819–1911), English cricketer and clergyman
John Taylor (cricketer, born 1849) (1849–1921), Nottinghamshire cricketer
John Taylor (cricketer, born 1850) (1850–1924), Yorkshire cricketer
John Taylor (cricketer, born 1923) (1923–1991), Hampshire cricketer
John Taylor (cricketer, born 1937), English cricketer
John Taylor (Welsh footballer) (1874–?), Wrexham A.F.C. and Wales international footballer
Jack Taylor (footballer, born 1914), English footballer
John Taylor (footballer, born 1924), English footballer
Jack Taylor (footballer, born 1924), English footballer
John Taylor (footballer, born 1926), English footballer
John Taylor (footballer, born 1928), English footballer
Brian Taylor (footballer, born 1931) (John Brian Taylor), English footballer
John Taylor (footballer, born 1935), English footballer
John Taylor (footballer, born 1939), English footballer
John Taylor (English footballer, born 1949), English footballer with Chester City, Rochdale and Stockport County
John Taylor (Scottish footballer, born 1949), Scottish football goalkeeper
John Taylor (footballer, born 1964), English footballer with Cambridge United and Bradford City
John Taylor (racing driver) (1933–1966), British racing driver
John Taylor (rallycross) (born 1941), Scottish rallycross (European champion 1973) and rally driver
John Taylor (rugby league), rugby league footballer of the 1950s and 1960s
John Taylor (rugby union, born 1945) (born 1945), rugby union footballer for British Lions, Wales, Loughborough Colleges, London Welsh, London Counties, and Surrey
John Taylor (swimmer) (1904–?), British freestyle swimmer

Other countries
John Taylor (cross-country skier) (born 1908), Canadian Olympic skier
John Taylor (hurler), Laois and Portlaoise hurler
John Taylor (All Black), rugby player, see List of All Blacks
John Taylor (Canadian football) (1925–2005), Canadian Football League player
John "Pondoro" Taylor (1904–1969), Irishman, game hunter, developer of the "Taylor KO Factor"

Other figures
John Taylor, protagonist of the Nightside books by Simon Green
John Taylor, one of the protagonists in Call of Duty: Black Ops III, a 2015 video game
John Taylor (born 1980), fitness coach on the reality television series Too Fat for 15: Fighting Back

Similar names
John Tayler (1742–1829), American politician from New York
John Tyler (1790 – 1862), Tenth president of the United States
A. J. P. Taylor (1906–1990), British historian

Organisations
John Taylor & Co, English bell foundry
John Taylor Collegiate, public high school in Winnipeg, Manitoba, Canada

See also
Jon Taylor (disambiguation)
Jack Taylor (disambiguation)
Jock Taylor (disambiguation)
Jonathan Taylor (disambiguation)
Taylor (disambiguation)
John Taylor (given name)